Halit is the Turkish spelling of the Arabic masculine given name Khalid (Arabic: خَالِد khālid) which means "eternal, everlasting, immortal". People with the name include:

Given name 
Halit Akçatepe (1938–2017), Turkish actor
Halit Akmansü (1883–1953), Ottoman Turkish military officer
Halit Haluk Babacan (born 1966), Turkish sailor
Halit Berzeshta (1840–1909), Albanian warlord
Halit Cıngıllıoglu (born 1954), Turkish businessman
Halit Deringör (1922–2018), Turkish football player
Halit Ergenç (born 1970), Turkish actor
Halit Karsıalan (1883–1925), commonly known as "Deli" Halid Pasha, Ottoman Turkish military officer
Halit Kılıç (born 1992), Turkish athlete
Halit Kıvanç (1925–2022), Turkish journalist
Hâlit Ziyâ Konuralp (1904–2005), Turkish physician
Halit Refiğ (1934–2009), Turkish film director
Halit Özgür Sarı (born 1993), Turkish actor
Halit Shamata (born 1954), Albanian author and politician 
Halit Ziya Uşaklıgil (1866–1945), Turkish author

Middle name 
Colo Halit Ahmet (born 1986), known as Colo Halit, Swedish football player
Yaşar Halit Çevik (born 1955), Turkish diplomat
Refik Halit Karay (1888–1965), Turkish writer and journalist

See also
Khalid (disambiguation)

Turkish masculine given names
Albanian masculine given names